St Michael's Church, Kirk Langley is a  Grade I listed parish church in the Church of England in Kirk Langley, Derbyshire.

History

The church dates from the 14th century. It was restored in 1839 and again in 1885 by George Frederick Bodley and Thomas Garner. New choir stalls were added in 1914 to the designs of George Frederick Bodley and made by Robert Bridgeman of Lichfield.

Memorials
Godfrey Meynell (d. 1854)
Alice Beresford (d. 1511)
Henry Role (d. 1559) and his wife
Charles Wilmot (d. 1724)

Organ

The pipe organ dates from 1894 and was built by Wadsworth. A specification of the organ can be found on the National Pipe Organ Register.

See also
Grade I listed churches in Derbyshire
Grade I listed buildings in Derbyshire
Listed buildings in Kirk Langley

References

Church of England church buildings in Derbyshire
Grade I listed churches in Derbyshire